Mühlacker is a town in the eastern part of the Enz district of Baden-Württemberg, Germany. Mühlacker station has direct rail connections with Stuttgart, Karlsruhe, Heidelberg, Pforzheim and the Northern Black Forest.

Mühlhausen an der Enz where Spree killer Ernst August Wagner killed 13 people in 1913 has been a part of the city since 1972. The community of Ötisheim joined onto the city so as to act as a single municipality for certain tasks.

History

Thirty Years' War
The Thirty Years' War brought hardship and misery. In 1648 only 50 inhabitants survived from originally 1242 inhabitants (1622). In the Nine Years' War (1688-1697)  Dürrmenz was looted in 1692 by French troops. Eckenweiher was incorporated to Dürrmenz in 1832.

Industrialisation
With the opening of the Württemberg Western Railway Stuttgart - Bruchsal in 1853 the industrial age began in the Dürrmenz-Mühlacker area. As the Karlsruhe-Mühlacker railway was built in 1863, Mühlacker was at the same railway junction and border station. As a curiosity, until 1930 it had two stations side by side, the larger Württemberg station and the Baden railway station. Favored by the dismantling of custom barriers 1819-1851 and the abolition of the compulsory guild (1862), industrial enterprises settled near the train station.

20th century

After World War I, inflation, great depression and high unemployment interrupted the further development. In 1930, the large Mühlacker radio transmitter was put into operation.

With the dissolution of Oberamt Maulbronn, young city Mühlacker in 1938 was incorporated into district Vaihingen. During the Nazi period five of the eight Jewish citizens of Mühlacker were murdered in Auschwitz.

The World War II ended in Mühlacker with destruction by air raids and artillery shelling. After 1945, 3000 refugees and displaced persons found settled in Mühlacker.

As part of the district reform on January 1, 1973, the district Vaihingen was dissolved. The western region, with the town of Mühlacker became part of the newly formed Enzkreis. The eastern part of the district Vaihingen was incorporated into the district of Ludwigsburg.

Sights
Since 1930, Mühlacker has been transmitter site, at which between 1934 and 1945 the tallest tower ever built of wood stood (height: 190 metres).

Further landmark are the water tower and the Löffelstelz castle ruin.

Twin towns – sister cities

Mühlacker is twinned with:
 Bassano del Grappa, Italy
 Schmölln, Germany

Notable people
Anna Catharina Wedderkopf (1715–1786), businesswoman, consultant and feminist
Hellmut G. Haasis (born 1942), writer and historian
Verena Veh (born 1977), volleyball player
Florian Naroska (born 1982), water polo player
Kim Jeffrey Kurniawan (born 1990), Indonesian footballer

References

External links
 
War memorials in Muehlacker cemetery at "Sites of Memory" webpage

Enzkreis
Württemberg
Holocaust locations in Germany